Lake Bonney (
) is a saline lake with permanent ice cover at the western end of Taylor Valley in the McMurdo Dry Valleys of Victoria Land, Antarctica.

It was first visited by the British National Antarctic Expedition of 1901-1904. It was named by the Robert Falcon Scott expedition of 1910-1913, for Thomas George Bonney, professor of geology at University College London, England from 1877 to 1901.

Lake Bonney is one of the main lakes studied by the National Science Foundations, McMurdo Long Term Ecological Research site.

Starting in 2007 NASA is funding an autonomous submersible robot called ENDURANCE to explore the water volume of the lake to study its shape and ecology. The robot is built by Stone Aerospace, who also developed the DEPTHX submersible. The Endurance Project is led by Peter Doran with Bill Stone and John Priscu among the co-investigators. Scientists have discovered an ancient ecosystem beneath the Taylor Glacier, next to Lake Bonney. This ecosystem survives by transforming sulfur and iron compounds for growth.

The work is seen as a stage in developing an autonomous submersible robot that could explore the ocean on Jupiter's moon Europa.

Tributaries
Lake Bonney is fed by a number of meltwater streams:
 Bartlette Creek
 Bohner Stream 
 Doran Stream (feeding Priscu Stream)
 Lawson Creek
 Lizotte Creek
 Lyons Creek
 Mason Creek
 Priscu Stream (the longest)
 Red River
 Santa Fe Stream
 Sharp Creek
 Vincent Creek

See also
Blood Falls, an outflow of the tip of the Taylor Glacier containing an iron oxide–tainted plume of melting salty water flowing onto the ice-covered surface of Lake Bonney
Lake Washburn (Antarctica), a precursor lake

Further reading
 Johanna Laybourn-Parry, Jemma L. Wadham, Antarctic Lakes, P 120
  Peter T. Doran, W. Berry Lyons, Diane M. McKnight, editors Life in Antarctic Deserts and other Cold Dry Environments: Astrobiological Analogs, P 164
 Obryk, M. K., P. T. Doran, and J. C. Priscu (2014), The permanent ice cover of Lake Bonney, Antarctica: The influence of thickness and sediment distribution on photosynthetically available radiation and chlorophyll‐a distribution in the underlying water column , J. Geophys. Res. Biogeosci., 119, 1879–1891, doi: 10.1002/2014JG002672
 Chao Tang, Michael T. Madigan, and Brian Lanoil, Bacterial and Archaeal Diversity in Sediments of West Lake Bonney, McMurdo Dry Valleys, Antarctica, Appl Environ Microbiol. 2013 Feb; 79(3): 1034–1038. doi: 10.1128/AEM.02336-12
 H.A. DUGAN, M.K. OBRYK, P.T. DORAN, Lake ice ablation rates from permanently ice-covered Antarctic lakes , Journal of Glaciology, Vol. 59, No. 215, 2013 doi:10.3189/2013JoG12J080, P 491
 Gideon M. Henderson, Brenda L. Hall, Andrew Smith, Laura F. Robinson, Control on (234U/ 238U) in lake water: A study in the Dry Valleys of Antarctica, Chemical Geology 226 (2006) 298 – 308
 Tessa Pocock and Marc-André Lachance, Thomas Pröschold, John C. Priscu, Sam Sulgi Kim, Norman P. A. Huner, IDENTIFICATION OF A PSYCHROPHILIC GREEN ALGA FROM LAKE BONNEY ANTARCTICA: CHLAMYDOMONAS RAUDENSIS ETTL. (UWO 241) CHLOROPHYCEAE, J. Phycol. 40, 1138–1148 (2004), doi: 10.1111/j.1529-8817.2004.04060.x
 Ernest E. Angino  Kenneth B. Armitage  Jerry C. Tash, PHYSICOCHEMICAL LIMNOLOGY OF LAKE BONNEY, ANTARCTICA , doi: 10.4319/lo.1964.9.2.0207

References

  U.S. Geological Survey, Geographic Names Information System. Accessed January 2008

Space Daily April 22, 2007. Accessed January 2008

External links

Lake data
Satellite map
Lake Bonney panoramic picture

Lakes of Victoria Land
McMurdo Dry Valleys
Saline lakes of Antarctica
Endorheic lakes of Antarctica